The Sun god of Heaven (Hittite: nepišaš Ištanu) was a Hittite solar deity. He was the second-most worshipped solar deity of the Hittites, after the Sun goddess of Arinna. The Sun god of Heaven was identified with the Hurrian solar deity, Šimige.

From the time of Tudḫaliya III, the Sun god of Heaven was the protector of the Hittite king, indicated by a winged solar disc on the royal seals, and was the god of the kingdom par excellence. From the time of Suppiluliuma I (and probably earlier), the Sun god of Heaven played an important role as the foremost oath god in interstate treaties.

As a result of the influence of the Mesopotamian Sun god Šamaš, the Sun god of Heaven also gained an important role as the god of law, legality, and truth.

See also
 List of solar deities

References

Bibliography 
 Piotr Taracha: Religions of Second Millennium Anatolia. Harrassowitz, Wiesbaden 2009, .
 Calvert Watkins: "The Golden Bowl: Thoughts on the New Sappho and its Asianic Background." Classical Antiquity. 26, 2007, pp. 305–324.
 Volkert Haas, Heidemarie Koch: Religionen des alten Orients: Hethiter und Iran. Vandenhoeck & Ruprecht, Göttingen 2011, .
 Maciej Popko: Völker und Sprachen Altanatoliens. Harrassowitz, Wiesbaden 2008, .

Hittite deities
Solar gods